The Ministry of Law (MinLaw; ;) is a ministry of the Government of Singapore responsible for the advancement in access to justice, the rule of law, the economy and society through policy, law and services.

Organisational structure

The Ministry of Law comprises
 Headquarters (HQ)
 Four departments (Insolvency and Public Trustee's Office, Legal Aid Bureau, Anti-Money Laundering / Countering the Financing of Terrorism Division, and Community Mediation Unit, the last of which oversees the Community Mediation Centres located at The Treasury and at the Subordinate Courts of Singapore)
 Three boards and tribunals (Appeals Board for Land Acquisitions, Land Surveyors Board and Copyright Tribunal)
 Two statutory boards (Intellectual Property Office of Singapore and Singapore Land Authority)

Ministers
The Ministry is headed by the Minister for Law, who is appointed as part of the Cabinet of Singapore. The incumbent minister is K. Shanmugam from the People's Action Party.

See also
Justice ministry
Politics of Singapore

References

External links

Official website of the Ministry of Law
Singapore Government Directory Interactive — Ministry of Law

Law
Singapore, Law
Singapore
1964 establishments in Singapore